Kimun Ongkosandjojo, born Ong Kiem Oen (1912–1990) was an Indonesian Chinese businessman, and inventor.
Ongkosandjojo was born in Wonogiri, and was of descent but grew up within Javanese culture. He was married to Tio Yan Nio and had 10 children. Ongkosandjojo was a polymath scholar who had a deep passion in studying worldwide history, science, astronomy, languages and nature. Because of this widespread curiosity, as a teenager Ongkosandjojo often replaced his lecturers while they were on military duties during World War II.

He co-founded and became President Director of PT Jamu Air Mancur, one of Indonesia's largest manufacturers of herbal medicine, since 1963, having worked there as Production Director since the company started in 1963.

  	 

1912 births
Indonesian people of Chinese descent
20th-century Indonesian businesspeople
People from Wonogiri Regency
1990 deaths